Sarah Nile (born 10 October 1985 in Naples) is an Italian-French model, showgirl, actress, dancer, and reality television personality.

Biography

Personal background
Born to an Italian mother and a Belgian father, Sarah Nile lives and works in Milan. She is fluent in three languages: (Italian, Spanish, and French). Nile has Italian and French citizenship. She gained the attention of Italian and international mass media when she became the first Playmate of the Month in the January 2009 relaunch of the Italian version of Playboy magazine. Nile represented Italy at the opening of Playboy Singapore in April 2009. In February 2010, Nile became Playmate of the Year of Playboy Italia.

Nile has a degree in physiotherapeutic massage. She likes to practice extreme sports like skydiving and she has a passion for motorbikes, a sport she has participated in since the age of 12.

Nile graduated from the Art College of Monteruscello and successfully attended the Academy of Fine Arts in Naples. She has exhibited her paintings in many art exhibitions in Spain (where she moved after she turned 18 years old), in Italy (from 2010 onward, after taking part in the Italian version of Big Brother), and in Mexico.

After six years of working for Playboy Italia, Nile changed agencies at the end of 2014 because she preferred to study acting.

Show business
From 7 December 2009 to 25 January 2010, Sarah Nile appeared as a Playmate realitystar in the 10th season of the Italian television series Grande Fratello. The program was hosted by Alessia Marcuzzi and aired on Canale 5 in prime time. In this reality show, Nile fell in love with another contestant,.

Career

Playboy Playmate
Nile began to gain attention after becoming the first Playmate of the Month (Centerfold: December 2008 / January 2009), of Playboy Italia. The edition was the relaunch of the monthly magazine, which had not been in print or online for several years.

As a Playmate, Nile was the presenter, with the members of Lo Zoo di 105, at the testimonial of the 2009 edition of the radio program and the competition named 105 Playmate aired on Radio 105 Network. Nile also participated in the Internazionali BNL d'Italia 2009 and at the Fiera Autopromotec 2009 – Fiera di Bologna 2009. She also appeared for Harley Davidson and Honda Racing Italia, at the Spanish Grand Prix (Circuit: Jerez de la Frontera), and with Francesca Lukasik at the Italian Grand Prix (Circuit: Mugello). She was judged the evening star, Madrina della Serata, in the 2009 edition of Pitti Uomo, one of the international fashion events organized by Pitti Immagine at the Fortezza da Basso in Florence. Nile was the star of the Playboy Summer Tour 2009. Her role at 105 Playmate has been confirmed and also in the five subsequent editions from 2010 to 2014.

Playmate of the Year
After being selected as the first Playmate of the Year for 2010, in Playboy Italia) at the beginning of December 2009 her cover was published in February 2010. Nile participated as a contestant in the 10th season of the Italian reality show Grande Fratello.

Nile, as a Playmate of the Year, was the presenter, with the members of Lo Zoo di 105, at the testimonial of the 2010 edition of the radio program and competition called 105 Playmate that aired on Radio 105 Network. Nile appeared with her colleagues Playmates Cristina De Pin and Francesca Lukasik to the San Marino Grand Prix (circuit: Misano) at the 2010 MotoGP World Championships. Nile was a star of the Playboy Summer Tour 2010. She was the Italian star at the 50th anniversary of the Playboy Clubs, an initiative by Hugh Hefner and Playboy America, held simultaneously in 50 selected Playboy Clubs around the world, transformed for the occasion, including Milano Marittima in Italy.).

Playboy International
Because she is "the most famous Italian Playboy Playmate in Europe", Nile represented Italy at the inauguration of Playboy Singapore, at an event held on 16 April 2009 in the famous city-state. She has become the first and only Italian Playmate of the Month (centerfold: in June 2009) on the Russian edition of Playboy. Moreover, she has participated, along with her colleagues Playmates of Playboy Italia Micol Ronchi, Cristina De Pin and Francesca Lukasik, at the photoshoot titled Playmates of Playboy Italy published in n. 201 (June 2009) in Playboy Poland.In June 2010, Nile posed along with Hope Dworaczyk, Mia Gray, Chantal Hanse and Eugenia Diordiychuk for the pictorial published in n. 211 (July 2010) of Playboy Poland. In December 2012 Nile posed naked for the 2013 nude calendar with Claudia Borroni and other models of the De Nardi cycling team.

Controviersies

The "poker duel" with Paris Hilton
According to some reports in Italy from the websites of La Repubblica Group, on 1 March 2009, Nile was chosen by Hugh Hefner to teach him Texas hold 'em poker and in so doing rejected Paris Hilton, causing her to be disappointed and jealous. At the time, Italian tabloids reported a flirtation between Hefner and Nile which she denied.

Love story with Veronica Ciardi
From 7 December 2009 to 25 January 2010 Sarah Nile participated in the 10th season of Grande Fratello (the Italian version of Big Brother). Nile developed a relationship with another contestant, Veronica Ciardi, which caused a scandal on Italian television because it was the first lesbian love story to air on an Italian reality show. Ciardi and Nile subsequently gained international notoriety. Along with Ciardi, Nile is the only Italian in The 2010 AfterEllen.com Hot 100, the world ranking published by webzine AfterEllen.com on 17 May 2010; this news was reported in Italy by Rupert Murdoch's Sky Italia.

References

External links

Sarah Nile – Official Website

1985 births
Living people
Big Brother (franchise) contestants
Grande Fratello
Italian female models
Italian people of Belgian descent
Italian showgirls
Italian television personalities
Models from Milan